The Cornfield, also known as Farmers' Independent Benevolent Society Hall, is a historic social hall located at Fly Creek in Otsego County, New York. It was built in 1928 and is a one-story wood-frame building constructed as a meeting space and dance hall for the area's small Slovenian immigrant community.  The original section measures 50 feet long by 24 feet, 6 inches wide.  The original building was expanded in the late 1950s with a kitchen wing and pavilion.

It was listed on the National Register of Historic Places in 2002.

References

Clubhouses on the National Register of Historic Places in New York (state)
Buildings and structures completed in 1928
Buildings and structures in Otsego County, New York
National Register of Historic Places in Otsego County, New York